Shri Madhwa Vadiraja Institute of Technology & Management is an engineering college located in Bantakal, near the temple town Udupi. It is affiliated to Visvesvaraya Technological University in Belagavi and approved by the All India Council for Technical Education, and the New Delhi and Karnataka state governments. The institute has been accredited by National Assessment and Accreditation Council) as Grade'A' college with CGPA of 3.13, which is the highest for any Engineering College in Coastal Karnataka and in Mysuru region of VTU.

History
The college was established in 2010 by Shri Sode Vadiraja Mutt Education Trust as Shri Madhwa Vadiraja Institute of Technology and Management under the guidance of H. H. Shri Vishwavallabha Theertha Swamiji of Shri Sode Vadiraja Mutt, Udupi who is the president of the trust. The initial intake was 60 students in 4 disciplines: civil engineering, mechanical engineering, electronics & communication engineering and computer science & engineering.

Campus

Location

The total campus area is 70 acres. It is located near by Bantakal village and is well connected by buses from Katapady, Udupi, and Bantakal. The campus is 6 km off Katapady. There are buses plying every 5 mins. The nearest railway station is in Manipal and nearest airport is Mangalore Airport.

Academics

Admission
Admission is done on the basis of performance of the candidate in the Common Entrance Test examination conducted by Karnataka Examinations Authority. The remaining seats are filled by Management quota.

Undergraduate programs
The college offers the following programs
Civil Engineering
Computer Science and Engineering
Electronics and Communication Engineering
Mechanical Engineering

Doctoral programs
The institute has recognised research centres in the following departments which offer doctoral program (PhD)
Civil Engineering
Electronics and Communication Engineering
Mechanical Engineering
Mathematics
Physics
Chemistry

Rankings

Student Activities
The college organizes a State-level inter-collegiate techno-cultural fest titled ‘Varnothsava' each year during Feb-March. Students from various colleges in Karnataka participate in this event. 

The college also organizes a unique project exhibition and competition on Industrial Internet of Things (IIOT) every year in October.

References

External links

Engineering colleges in Karnataka
Universities and colleges in Udupi district